A sex doll (also love doll, fuck doll or blowup doll) is a type of anthropomorphic sex toy in the size and shape of a sexual partner. The sex doll may consist of an entire body, or just a head, pelvis, or other body part (vagina, anus, mouth, penis, breasts) intended for sexual stimulation. The parts sometimes vibrate and may be moveable and interchangeable. Sex dolls exist in many forms, but are usually distinguished from sex robots, which are anthropomorphic creations designed to be able to engage in more complex interactions.

History 
Some of the first sex dolls were created by French (dame de voyage) and Spanish (dama de viaje) sailors in the sixteenth century who would be isolated during long voyages. These masturbatory dolls were often made of sewn cloth or old clothes and were a direct predecessor to today's sex dolls. Later, the Dutch sold some of these dolls to Japanese people during the Rangaku period, and the term "Dutch wives" is still sometimes used in Japan to refer to sex dolls.

One of the earliest recorded appearances of manufactured sex dolls dates to 1908, in Iwan Bloch's The Sexual Life of Our Time. Bloch wrote:

In 1918, Austrian artist Oskar Kokoschka commissioned a life-sized doll of Alma Mahler (whom Kokoschka was in love with) to German puppet maker Hermine Moos, while he was in Dresden. Although intended to simulate Alma and receive his affection, the "Alma doll" did not satisfy Kokoschka and he destroyed it during a party.

German surrealist artist Hans Bellmer has been described as “the father figure of the modern sex doll” for his sex puppets in the 1930s whose more realistic models moved sex dolls further into the future. Bellmer made three dolls, increasingly sophisticated in design, which also made waves in the international art community.

A report that, as part of the Borghild Project, Nazi Germany made sex dolls for soldiers during World War II has not been verified by reliable sources and is now considered to be a hoax. It is however said that the commercial sex doll has its origins in Germany, especially since the creation of the Bild Lilli doll in the 1950s, which was in turn the inspiration for creating the famous Barbie doll.

The production of human simulacra to substitute for human sexual partners took several technological leaps forward in the late twentieth century.  By the 1970s, vinyl, latex and silicone had become the materials most frequently used in the manufacture of sex dolls; silicone, in particular, allowed a greater degree of realism.

A 1982 attempt to import a consignment of sex dolls into Britain had the unintended consequence of ending the law against importing "obscene or indecent" items that were not illegal to sell within the UK. Having had the dolls seized by Her Majesty's Customs and Excise officers, David Sullivan's Conegate Ltd. took the case all the way to the European Court of Justice, and won in 1987. Britain was forced to lift its stringent import prohibitions dating from 1876 because for imports from within the European Community they constituted a barrier to free trade under the terms of the Treaty of Rome.

Shin Takagi, founder of the company Trottla, manufactures lifelike child sex dolls in the belief that doing so provides a safe and legal outlet for men expressing pedophilic desires. This has been disputed by paraphilia researcher Dr. Peter J. Fagan, who argues that contact with the products would likely have a reinforcing effect, increasing the risk of pedophilic action being taken. Since 2013, Australian officials have confiscated imported shipments of juvenile sex dolls legally classified as child exploitation material. However, machine ethicists Michael Anderson and Susan Leigh Anderson point out that sales of sex dolls are not and have never been a commercially significant industry, and can never become anything like as corrupting a source of money as psychiatric medication have since deinstitutionalization made psychiatric medication sales profitable by doing away with the cost of keeping the patients in mental hospitals, as selling dolls that are kept by the patients for a long time can never reach the sale volumes of medicines that the patients take on a daily basis. Corruption by psychiatric medication sale money is argued by Michael Anderson and Susan Leigh Anderson to be a cause of psychiatry alleging reinforcement, as studies of pedophilia show no correlation between the age of the pedophiles and their degree of fixation onto children or preferred age of children (unlike drug addicts for whom higher doses and lower effects of the same doses correlate with higher ages of the narcomanes) and penile plethysmograph studies on community samples of men with guaranteed anonymity show that the prevalence of sexual attraction to prepubescent children is much lower in the population than sexual attraction to adolescents which does not support the theory of reinforcement towards lower ages.

Sales of sex dolls increased significantly during the COVID-19 pandemic.

Commercial forms 
Cheaper sex dolls are inflatable, using air. These dolls, representing the lowest price range (less than US$75), are usually made of welded vinyl and bear only a passing resemblance to actual people.  They have an artificial and typically crudely designed vagina or penis, but due to their affordability, many users are willing to overlook their shortcomings. They often burst at the seams after a few uses, although they are commonly given as gag gifts and therefore many may not be used at all. In Russia, for some years the Bubble Baba Challenge humorously featured participants river rafting on blowup dolls as a matter of entertainment but in 2013 the race was canceled on "health and safety" grounds.

At the middle market price range ($100 to approximately $1,000), dolls are made of thicker vinyl or heavy latex without welded seams or a polyurethane and silicone mixture, typically surrounding a foam core.  Most have plastic mannequin-style heads and styled wigs, plastic or glass eyes, and occasionally properly molded hands and feet. Some vinyl dolls can contain water-filled body areas such as the breasts or buttocks. Latex dolls were made in Hungary, China and France but only the French manufacturer Domax now remains in production. 

The manufacturing process causes most latex dolls to be delivered with a fine coating of zinc oxide covering the skin, which is usually removed by the consumer by placing the doll under the shower. Otherwise, latex is an inert and non-toxic natural material; although a small percentage of users may discover a latex allergy.

The most expensive sex dolls (approximately $1,200 and up) are usually made from silicone (usually above $3,000 at 2016 prices) or thermoplastic elastomer known as TPE (below $3,000). Dolls made of either material can be very lifelike, with faces and bodies modeled on real people in some instances, with realistic skin material (similar to that used for movie special effects), and with realistic (or even real) hair. These dolls usually have an articulated PVC or metal skeleton with flexible joints that allow them to be positioned in a variety of positions for display and for sexual acts. Silicone or TPE dolls are much heavier than vinyl or latex inflatable ones (which consist mostly of air), but are roughly half the weight of a real human being of comparable size.

Because of their ability to be posed in different positions silicone dolls are popular with artists and photographers as models.

Their name originates from the term, possibly English, for the thick rattan or bamboo bolster, used to aid sleep in humid countries by keeping one's limbs lifted above sweaty sheets. 
Orient Industry is considered to be the leading manufacturer of high-end silicone dolls in Japan, which started using another term  around 1998 to distinguish their dolls from the image of inflatable dolls associated with the term "Dutch wife". The term has stuck and is now used generally to refer to any high-end product.
There is a business, Doru no Mori (Doll Forest) in Tokyo, that rents love dolls and rooms to male customers. In March 2007 the Japanese daily Mainichi Shimbun newspaper reported that there are also rental businesses that bring the dolls to the customer's home, and that the specialist love-doll magazine i-doloid has a print-run of 10,000 copies per issue.

The middle market and high-end market emerged in the USA around 1992. The market has grown for two main reasons. Firstly, the last twenty years have seen huge improvements over earlier types of sex dolls, and customers come to realize this through using the web. Secondly, the method of retail purchase has also improved, now showing customers what the actual doll, seams, hair, and even orifices look like.

In China the market has mushroomed on account of the demographic effects of the one-child policy and accordingly numerous new Chinese manufacturers have appeared in recent years.

Non-standard forms 
In Japan  one can purchase inflatable or stuffed love pillows or dakimakura that can be fitted with a cover printed with a life-size picture of a porn star or anime character. Other less common novelty love dolls include overweight, intersex, and alien dolls, which are usable for pleasure but also tend to be given as gag gifts.

Some companies manufacture cloth sex dolls using the same technology that is used to create plush toys. With widespread cultural use of the internet amongst younger generations, numerous forums exist for amateurs who create their own sex dolls from fabric or other materials. There are even mailing lists for discussing techniques and experiences with MLDs (material love dolls) .

Some inflatable sex dolls are made in the form of animals, most notably sheep and cows. These dolls are more of a joke gift or party novelty and are often not suitable for sexual use.

New materials and technologies 

Silicone dolls were at first made from tin-cure silicone but platinum technology has better longevity, less prone to tears and compression marks. For this reason, the "RealDoll" manufacturer reported switching from the tin to the platinum material in June 2009 and all other manufacturers have followed suit.

Since 2012 or so, a thermoplastic elastomer alternative known as TPE has come into common use particularly by Chinese manufacturers which have enabled realistic dolls to be made which are cheaper than those composed of the high quality expensive platinum cure silicone.

CybOrgasMatrix dolls used an elastic gel, which they claimed to be superior to silicone in elasticity, shape memory, and durability. Both this company and the company "First Androids" once offered pelvic thruster motor, audio capability, and heated orifices, though these options are no longer available. Several modern doll manufacturers now offer the last option on their silicone dolls, with the addition of an internal heating system.

Foam dolls have now become available from EX Doll and SeeDree dolls, in hope of making Sex Dolls a lighter weight. Cloud Climax reports that they can be as low as 9 kg, whilst being a life-sized doll and that the heads are silicone for realism.

Ethical Considerations Surrounding the Emergence of Sex Dolls and Robots

Scholarly Debates over Sex Dolls and Robots 
The emergence of sex dolls and robots has raised ethical concerns and sparked debates among scholars. Some argue that they promote sexist objectification and should not be developed or used at all. Others suggest that, if designed ethically, sex robots can have positive effects on individual and social well-being. This would involve safeguarding advanced sentient robots with robocentric ethics and obtaining explicit consent for sexual interaction. Despite these considerations, ethical questions surrounding robot prostitution remain unresolved and continue to fuel debate.

Legal restrictions and issues

General 
In 2019, the Israeli media reported on an incident where a European sex dolls company created a sex doll that is based on the Israeli model, Yael Cohen Aris, without her permission. In 2020, the same story was further investigated and reported by Playboy, and was mentioned in relation to Deepfake.

The importation of sex dolls for men has been banned in Botswana according to Section 178 of the Botswana Penal Code. The law further abolishes the right to "possess, lend, trade-in, export, import, and or exhibit obscene objects or any objects tending to corrupt morals in Botswana", which includes sex dolls.

Austria
As prostitution is legalized and regulated, there are no legal restrictions concerning sex dolls in Austria and numerous brothels are offering sex dolls for clients. Although sex dolls originally started appearing in Austria around 1980, they gained popularity in 2017 when a brothel started offering sex doll services to clients. This can be attributed to the fact that the dolls have become more realistic in recent years.

In addition to being able to have intercourse with the sex doll, some places allow clients to purchase sex dolls for themselves. One of the biggest laufhauses in Vienna offers sex in the laufhaus with dolls alongside real women.

According to brothel owners who offer sex dolls, the dolls are being properly cleaned after every session. Unprotected sex with sex dolls is also allowed, but it is not advised as there is no guarantee that the dolls are being cleaned after each client.

South Korea 
In 2018, the South Korean Supreme Court ruled to legalize the sale of sex dolls. The issue still remains controversial in the country.

China 
In China, it is not illegal  to buy and use sex dolls. In the past year, sex doll experience halls have appeared in many cities in China.

United States 
Sex dolls that look like children have been banned from Florida, Kentucky, and Tennessee.

United Kingdom 
Sex dolls that look like children are illegal to import and carry up to 7 years in prison under several acts, one of which is an 1876 customs importation act on Obscene articles. However, the law is not directly specific on what constitutes a child doll and as such all sex dolls are technically illegal until decided otherwise by a border agent upon importation and inspection, the only guidelines known by vendors is to ensure the doll is taller than 140cms and this can be observed on UK sites since you'll not find dolls below this height, other factors affecting the outcome of a case will likely be breast size and the subjective opinion on the age of the face.

Myanmar
In Myanmar, it was highly public criticized on October 22, 2022, when people paid obeisance to China-made two silicone sex dolls as the two goddesses Thurathadi and Thiri Devi at the Shwedagon Pagoda. The dolls are owned by an alchemist named Inn Weizzamo. He bought the dolls from China for US$2,400 each, and worshiped them by dressing in royal clothes.  On the same day, he was arrested for allegedly causing harm to Buddhism.

The sayadaw Min Thunya (Buddhist University) says that "the act of worshiping two silicone sex dolls in the form of two noble goddesses is an insult to the religion. It's really shameful."

Sex robots

In June 2006, Henrik Christensen of the European Robotics Research Network told the UK's Sunday Times that "people are going to be having sex with robots within five years."

Reacting to the ongoing development of "sex robots" or "sexbots", in September 2015, Kathleen Richardson of De Montfort University and Erik Billing of the University of Skövde created the Campaign Against Sex Robots, calling for a ban on the creation of anthropomorphic sex robots.  They argue that the introduction of such devices would be socially harmful, and demeaning to women and children.

State of research 
Compared to pornography for which thousands, and compared to sex robots for which dozens of scientific studies are available, sex dolls, their use and effects have been relatively little researched so far. This is not surprising because sex dolls are a subtype of sex toys, and sex toys as material sexual objects are fairly under-researched in general.

Nevertheless, a systematic review from the year 2020 was able to identify 29 published academic studies on sex dolls. These sex doll studies deal with the following five research questions:

What are appropriate theoretical conceptualizations of sex dolls?
How are sex dolls represented in art and media?
What empirical findings on the use and effect of sex dolls are available through interviews, surveys or analyses of sex doll online forums?
What therapeutic uses and effects of sex dolls are documented in clinical case studies?
Should there be a legal regulation of child sex dolls, and if yes, why and how?

Overall, the current state of research shows that sex doll owners (so far, the majority are men) and their uses are diverse and that sex dolls can be associated with negative and positive effects. Likewise, the available empirical studies with sex doll owners indicate that they do not only regard and treat their dolls as “sex” dolls, but sometimes also as “love” dolls or social companions. A clinical case study explained how living with a doll helped a divorced man to overcome relationship trauma and get ready to approach real women again. Psychological theories that can explain the human-doll relationship are, among others, the theory of transitional objects or the theory of parasocial interactions and relationships usually applied to media personas.

In popular culture 

In the BBC programme Desert Island Discs, aired since 1942 with little interruption, guests were also permitted to bring either a book or a "luxury" in addition to musical recordings.  Several chose life-size dolls: Oliver Reed, Ronnie Scott (who settled instead for a saxophone), and Duncan Carse.

The fictional narrator in the Italian writer Tommaso Landolfi's comic short story "Gogol's Wife" describes several visits to the subject of his biography, Nikolai Gogol.  At that renowned 19th century Russian writer's residence, the future biographer finds Gogol, referred to throughout as Nikolai Vassilevitch (his personal name and patronymic), with a life-size, anatomically correct blow-up doll. In later visits, the doll is described with more and more human attributes, bringing the story ever more into the realm of fantastic fiction.

See also 

Agalmatophilia
Artificial vagina
CandyGirl
RealDoll
Doll fetish
Gynoid
List of inflatable manufactured goods
Robot fetishism
Uncanny valley
Sex machine
Object sexuality
Xdolls

References

Bibliography
 Alexandre, Elisabeth. Des Poupées et des hommes — enquete sur l'amour Artif. (2005).  (Book is in French - 'Dolls and Men — Investigation into Artificial Love').
 Dorfman, Elana. Still Lovers (2005). . (Female art/fashion photographer photographs men and their dolls).
 Guys and Dolls: Art, Science, Fashion, and relationships. Royal Pavilion, Libraries, and Museums. (2005). (102-page catalog of a major exhibition at Brighton Museum and Art Gallery, England).
 Moya, Cynthia Ann. (2006) "Artificial Vaginas and Sex Dolls: An Erotological Investigation." Dissertation, San Francisco, CA: Institute for Advanced Study of Human Sexuality. Available in hardcopy  or CD-ROM .

External links 

"Just Like a Woman"- Salon.com article describing cultural phenomenon of RealDolls
 - original, more detailed version of the Salon article
 Sexbot slaves - Thanks to new technology, sex toys are becoming tools for connection - but will sexbots reverse that trend?  (June 2014), Leah Reich, Aeon